Lucky Star is a 2013 Malayalam comedy-drama film written and directed by Deepu Anthikkad in his directorial debut. The film stars Jayaram and Mukesh alongside Rachana Narayanankutty, who debuts in cinema. The film is about how a surrogate child  bring a sea change in the life of his proxy  parents.  Lucky Star released on 8 March 2013.

Cast
 Jayaram as Ranjith
 Mukesh as Dr. John Chitillapally
 Rachana Narayanankutty as Janaki
 Viroj Dasani as Lucky
 Pooja Ramachandran as Swapna
 Mamukoya as Pappan
 T. G. Ravi as Bhaskaran
 Ammu Ramachandran as Sumithra
 Sreekumar

Reception
Oneindia gave the film 3 stars out of 5 and stated "the first half is extremely funny and entertaining, the second half gets a little serious." while Indiaglitz called it " A light-hearted entertainer that's an easy watch." Times of India gave 3.5 stars out of 5. Sify wrote "this film is not entirely bad and has its moments as well, but it could have been much better.” Rediff gave 2.5 stars out of 5 and wrote "Lucky Star could have been a much better film if a little more thought had been given to how the film should progress in the second half."

Soundtrack 
The film's soundtrack contains 4 songs, all composed by Ratheesh Vegha. Lyrics by Rafeeq Ahamed and  Arjun Vinod Varma (Ajju).

References

External links
 

2013 films
2010s Malayalam-language films
2013 comedy-drama films
2013 directorial debut films
Indian comedy-drama films